My Best Friend Is a Vampire (also known as I Was a Teenage Vampire) is a 1987 American comedy horror film directed by Jimmy Huston. The story revolves around a newly made vampire who is trying to live as a "good" vampire and not feed on humans. Jeremy is played by Robert Sean Leonard with René Auberjonois as Jeremy's vampire guidance counselor and David Warner as a vampire hunter. The film's themes include prejudice, identity, gender roles, and adolescence.

Plot
Jeremy Capello (Robert Sean Leonard) is a typical American teenager from Houston struggling with getting himself a girlfriend. Although he has caught the eye of his school's head cheerleader Candy Andrews (LeeAnne Locken), he has his attention fixed on his classmate and band geek Darla Blake (Cheryl Pollak), who in turn is unnerved by his constant staring at her.

Recently, Jeremy has been having some weird nightmares about a strange woman trying to seduce him, and later he actually encounters that woman named Nora (Cecilia Peck), who makes an obvious invitation to him, while delivering groceries. His skirt-chasing friend Ralph (Evan Mirand) convinces him to take up the opportunity for a first erotic experience. But the encounter goes badly: First the woman bites him in the neck, then two strangers burst into the house, forcing Jeremy to run for his life. (It's heavily implied Nora was hijacking his dreams to lure him in)

The next morning, Jeremy looks pale and does not feel well, and he sees in his father's newspaper that Nora's house has mysteriously burned down. Also, throughout the day he notices a strange man observing him. This man pops into his bedroom the very next night, introduces himself as Modoc (René Auberjonois) and carefully attempts to relay to Jeremy that he is now a vampire (albeit a living one, not an undead). Jeremy is initially highly skeptical, but a sudden aversion to garlic, an increasing sensitivity to sunlight and craving for blood slowly convince him otherwise. His new vampire "life-style" hampers his attempts to start a relationship with Darla, who has finally become interested in him; otherwise Jeremy begins to adapt to the minor impacts the change has brought to his life. Modoc even gives him a guide book and explains to him that vampires are just like any other "minority group" that has been persecuted over the centuries.

Slowly, Jeremy's parents (Kenneth Kimmins and Fannie Flagg) notice that their son is behaving "most peculiarly" and begin to suspect that he may be a homosexual and that he is getting mixed up with bad company. To add to the ensuing confusion, the two men who had burst in on Jeremy's adventure are actually vampire hunters: Zealous professor Leopold McCarthy (David Warner) is determined to stop a "vampire armageddon" with the help of his feeble assistant Grimsdyke (Paul Willson). They are in the process of tracking their newest victim, but due to a mix-up they believe that Ralph is the vampire.

One night, when Jeremy finally begins to exploit his new capabilities and wins back Darla's trust, McCarthy and Grimstyke kidnap Ralph and intend to "free his soul" in a small chapel. Jeremy and Darla arrive in time to save him, but then Jeremy is recognized as a vampire, and only his new-found power of hypnotism and the timely arrival of Modoc and Nora, who has come back from the dead, manage to save the day. Since McCarthy remains unrelenting, Modoc's female consorts turn McCarthy into a vampire, making a friend out of an enemy.

The film ends with the Capellos assuring Jeremy that they love him and to "Just be happy with who you are." Jeremy then introduces Darla to his delightfully surprised parents, while Ralph just shakes his head at the whole hubbub.

Cast
 Robert Sean Leonard as Jeremy Capello
 Cheryl Pollak as Darla Blake
 René Auberjonois as Modoc
 Evan Mirand as Ralph
 David Warner as Professor Leopold McCarthy
 Paul Willson as Grimsdyke
 Fannie Flagg as Mrs. Capello
 Kenneth Kimmins as Mr. Capello
 Cecilia Peck as Nora
 Kathy Bates as Helen Blake (credited as Kathy D. Bates)
 John Chappell as Buddy Blake
 LeeAnne Locken as Candy Andrews (credited as Lee Anne Locken)
 Michelle La Vigne as Flo
 Harvey Christiansen as George
 Erica Zeitlin as Gloria
 Amelia Kinkade as Brunette in Punk Bar (credited as Mimi Kincaide)

Production notes
The film was shot in Houston, Texas, and LaPorte, Texas.

Other titles
This movie was released under the title I Was a Teenage Vampire in Australia.

See also
Vampire film

External links
 
 
 
 

1987 films
1987 horror films
1980s comedy horror films
1980s teen comedy films
1980s teen horror films
American comedy horror films
American teen comedy films
American teen horror films
Films scored by Steve Dorff
Films set in Houston
Films shot in Houston
Films shot in Los Angeles
Films with screenplays by Tab Murphy
American vampire films
Vampire comedy films
1987 comedy films
1980s English-language films
1980s American films